Rhabdocrates sporomantis is a species of sedge moth, and the only species in the genus Rhabdocrates. It was described by Edward Meyrick in 1931. It is found in Peru.

References

Moths described in 1931
Glyphipterigidae